The Providence Rugby Football Club (PRFC) is a rugby union club based in Providence, Rhode Island. Founded in 1969, the club consist of both a men's and women's (PWRFC) rugby teams. PRFC competes in Division III of the New England Rugby Football Union (NERFU).

History 
Providence RFC was founded in the fall of 1969 by several local athletes with rugby experience and players from the Brown University rugby team.

The club got its start in 1969 thanks, in part, to the efforts of Dave "Ace" Zucconi, a Brown Alumnus who learned the game while serving in the U.S. Air Force overseas. Zucconi drafted several Brown Alumni to play on Sundays and in the first year (’69–’70) the team won all of the thirteen matches they played.

P.R.F.C.’s first official season was the spring of 1971. The club was recognized by the New England R.F.U. after an organizational meeting by five of P.R.F.C.'s founders - Mike Diffley, Jay Fluck, Bob Hoder, Bill Mullin and Hal Wilder. In its first season P.R.F.C. posted an 11–4 record, including a second Guinness Championship. Since then, the club has won the annual N.E.R.F.U. championship twice, 1975 and 1990, two championships at Saranac Lake, 1976 and 1977, plus several successful tours to England and Scotland in 1976, Ireland in 1979, and to England, Scotland and Ireland in 1987.

In more recent history, the Providence Rugby Club has continued to build upon the ways of the club's founders.

The 2005 season saw the club make the National Sweet 16's for the second time in club history, doing so by virtue of hard-fought wins in the North East Regional Playoffs against Union, NJ and a highly regarded Hartford team. Unfortunately the successful campaign of 2005 led to a number of retirements, which, when combined with injuries to key players, left Providence with a disappointing 4-4 2006 season.

After finishing just out of playoff competition due to tiebreaker criteria in the fall of 2004 Providence placed second in the Spring NERFU. In 2002, PRFC captured the regular season New England Division II championship by virtue of a 7–1 record.

Following a trip to the National Round of 16 in 2009, Providence underwent a brief rebuilding process that seems to be coming to fruition.  With a mix of local and international talent, PRFC has shown to be advancing back to the top of New England  Rugby once again.

The 2011 season saw the club achieve a 6–3 record while playing some of the areas toughest competition.  The collective club efforts culminated in a 50–0 victory over rival Newport to retain the Rhode Island  Cup.

After 2011 Providence had a long stretch of seasons where commitment became an issue and they posted a stretch of sub .500 seasons and a low number of new players coming... in the future did not look bright.

The 2017 season was a big turning point for the club as things began to turn around for the men's team. With a drop-down to D3 PRFC was able to begin rebuilding with younger talent. With their combination of youth and experience Providence was able to go 17–1 in two fall seasons and the #1 seed back to back years.

On top of the high level of team play, PRFC has produced two MLR players in as many seasons. William Stewart (NOLA Gold) and Mani Young (New England Free Jacks) were both part of the club for a number of years before finding their way into the pro's.

Providence continues to field highly competitive and successful summer 7's teams. The team has used the summer to foster strong relationships with returning local college players and as a stepping stone to successful conference play in the fall season.

Old Boys
Providence Rugby has a history dating back to 1969. The club has many former members who play with the Rhody Old Cocks.

Women 
Providence Women's Rugby Football Club was founded in January 2004 by a group of local college graduates and then Providence College coach Richard Ashfield. The women - who were primarily from Providence College, URI, Stonehill College and Brown University - decided to work with the established men's team in Providence start a sister club.

Following three seasons of summer 7ís in which the women team consistently brought home hardware, including 1st place at Danbury in 2004, the ladies faced a challenging 15ís schedule in their first season, but have quickly gone from a new club trying to find its footing to a playoff contender, by knocking off the longstanding top teams in the league, Seacoast and Hartford.

In 2006, the women rose to the challenge of a tough league schedule to finish with a 4–1 record in league play, and a 5–1 record overall. The season ended in a disappointing fashion: despite completing the season with the same record (4-1) as the other top teams in the division, Providence lost the playoff seed due to the scoring system tiebreaker.

In 2007, the women won the NERFU championship and placed third in the Northeast Championship.

In 2008, the women won a second NERFU championship and placed second in the Northeast Championship, giving them a chance to go for a National Championship. The women placed 5th in the Nation.

The women have made a name for themselves as a top club in NERFU DII,  losing 2 league games in the last 3 years, in a short period of time and with a young core group the team should be a top contender for the league title for years to come.

External links
http://www.providencerugby.com Providence Rugby Football Club

Sports in Providence, Rhode Island
Rugby union teams in Rhode Island